Margarett R. Best  is a former politician in Ontario, Canada. She was a Liberal member of the Legislative Assembly of Ontario from 2007 to 2013 who represented the riding of Scarborough—Guildwood. She was a cabinet minister in the government of Dalton McGuinty.

Background
Best, an African Canadian lawyer and community activist, was born in Jamaica. She was educated at the University of Toronto, Scarborough Campus and Osgoode Hall Law School of York University. She holds a Mutual Fund Certificate from the Investment Funds Institute of Canada.

She is a mother, an avid gardener who loves the arts and has a passion for writing. In 2006 she was awarded the African Canadian Achievement Award and another African Canadian Achievement Award in 2011 for Excellence in Politics.

In 2008, she was conferred with an honorary Doctor of Laws degree by the Northern Caribbean University. Best has also received the BBPA Women of Distinction Award and, in October 2009, was bestowed with a 2009 National Ethnic Press and Media Council of Canada Award in the Distinguished Services category of Equality/Social Justice. She was named one of Canada's most influential women in Sports and Physical Activity in 2010 and received a City of Toronto Diversity Award in 2011. In 2012, she received a Queen Elizabeth II Diamond Jubilee Medal for her work as a public servant and the 2012 Canadian Association of Black Lawyers(CABL)Pathfinder Award. She was awarded the Jackie Robinson's Fortitude Award, named one of Canada's 100 most Accomplished Black Women in 2016, and named the 2017 Canadian National Laureate for the Rev. Dr. Martin Luther King, Jr. Lifetime Achievement Award.

Best has also been recognized by the Women's Multicultural Resource and Counselling Centre of Durham for her commitment to social and gender equality issues. She received a "Reaching Out and Giving Back Award" from the Prospect Primary School Alumni Association of Canada, and a Professional Award of Excellence from the Federation of St. Kitts and Nevis.
 
She was a member of the Law Society of Upper Canada Solicitor's Examination Blueprint Committee, the Board of the Women's Multicultural Resource and Counselling Centre of Durham, Sheena's Place Breakfast Committee, and the College Compensations and Appointment Council. 
 
Her community work includes advocating for public safety and diversity awareness as a member of the Ontario Provincial Police Advisory Committee. She presented seminars and facilitated entrepreneurial workshops for under-serviced youths and mentored young people on possible career choices in law, as a panelist with the Applause Institute; and was a member of the Mature Student Association and Black Law Student Association of Osgoode Hall Law School. She is a sponsor for PACE (Project for the Advancement of Childhood Education) for Love Lane Basic School, the Basic School she attended as a child in Jamaica. For the past six years, she has hosted an annual Scarborough Youth Career Fair in her Constituency of Scarborough-Guildwood.  Responding to the recent incidents of youth gun violence, she hosted her first successful Youth Forum in January 2013.

Politics
A member of the Ontario Legislature since 2007, she was appointed Minister of Consumer Services in October 2011, following her re-election to the Ontario Legislature as MPP, Scarborough-Guildwood.

She was first elected in 2007, and appointed as the Minister of Health Promotion and Sport, which supported a wide range of programs and services that include chronic disease prevention, physical activity, sport participation, injury prevention and mental wellness.

In 2008, she introduced legislation banning smoking in cars when children were present. The Bill called the Smoke-Free Ontario Amendment Act'' imposed a fine of $250 for transgressors.

In August 2010, the name of the Ministry of Health Promotion and Sport was changed to include sports as part of the Ministry's name to reflect the fact that sport was a key component of her Ministerial responsibilities. She was the lead Minister and a key part of the team led by Premier Dalton McGuinty in Ontario's successful bid for the 2015 Pan/Parapan American Games.
 
Best was re-elected 2011. The result was significant because it made her the first Black / African-Canadian woman to be re-elected to the Provincial Legislature in the Province of Ontario. Following the election, she was appointed as Minister of Consumer Services by Dalton McGuinty.

In her capacity as Minister of Consumer Services, she introduced Bill 82, The Wireless Services Agreements Act, 2012, an Act to strengthen consumer protection with respect to consumer agreements relating to wireless services accessed from a cellular phone, smart phone or any other similar mobile device. The Bill died when Premier Dalton McGuinty prorogued the Ontario Legislature in October 2012. Best also did extensive work on reform of the Condominium Act, including developing the framework for legislative reform of the Act and led the consultation process. She worked on the amendments to the Not for Profit Business Corporations Act; and the reform of the Delegated Administrative Authorities Act, which was introduced as part of the 2012 Budget Bill. She introduced several consumer protection initiatives.

She was a member of the Health Education and Social Policy Committee and the Legislation and Regulation Committee of the 39th and 40th Parliament of Ontario, and she sat on the Poverty Reduction Committee of the 39th Parliament of Ontario.

In February 2013, she was appointed as parliamentary assistant to the Minister of Education by the new premier Kathleen Wynne. Her exclusion from Wynne's first cabinet was initially reported as a demotion for political reasons, although it was later revealed that Best had asked to have her duties reduced for undisclosed health reasons.

On June 27, 2013, she announced her resignation as a MPP.

Cabinet posts

Electoral record

References

External links

1958 births
Black Canadian politicians
Canadian women lawyers
Jamaican emigrants to Canada
Lawyers in Ontario
Living people
Members of the Executive Council of Ontario
Ontario Liberal Party MPPs
Osgoode Hall Law School alumni
People from Scarborough, Toronto
Politicians from Toronto
University of Toronto alumni
Women government ministers of Canada
Women MPPs in Ontario
Black Canadian women
21st-century Canadian politicians
21st-century Canadian women politicians
Black Canadian lawyers
Black Canadian activists